Ñawpallaqta or Ñawpa Llaqta (Quechua  ñawpa ancient, llaqta place (village, town, city, country, nation), "ancient place", also spelled Nawpallacta) is an archaeological site in Peru. It lies in the Ayacucho Region, Víctor Fajardo Province, on the border of the districts of Cayara and Huancapi.

References 

Archaeological sites in Peru
Archaeological sites in Ayacucho Region